Kevin Yow Yeh (1941– 27 June 1975) was an Australian rugby league player for the Balmain Tigers in the New South Wales Rugby League premiership competition, his position of choice was on the . His great-nephew is retired Brisbane Broncos player Jharal Yow Yeh.

Queensland career

Yow Yeh began his career in Gladstone, and played for the Redcliffe Dolphins.  In 1964 Yow Yeh was named the Redcliffe club's player of the year and in 1965 Redcliffe defeated Valleys at Lang Park to win the Brisbane Rugby League grand final.

Sydney career

He was then sold to the Balmain Tigers along with fellow Redcliffe player Arthur Beetson for a fee of about 1,500 pounds each.  According to Beetson in his autobiography Yow Yeh was of Aboriginal and South Sea Islander descent.  His nickname was "Rab" or "Rabbie".

His highlight for Balmain came in his debut season when he appeared for them at centre in the 1966 NSWRFL season's grand final against the St. George Dragons, a game which they eventually lost.  Kevin only played two seasons for the club and because he could never fully adjust to city life he left Balmain at the end of the 1967 NSWRFL season to return home. He will be remembered for being involved in a great covering tackle by Canterbury fullback Les Johns at the Sydney Sports Ground also in 1966.

Later life and death

Arthur Beetson wrote of Yow Yeh: "he couldn't live with the white man, a hatred inspired by the attitudes of some. It virtually killed him". Yow Yeh's suffering manifested as alcoholism.  He died in the watchhouse at Mackay Jail on 27 June 1975, supposedly of a heart attack.  Beetson has "always been suspicious" about the circumstances and considers it "another Aboriginal death in custody" where the true real story will never be revealed.

References

 Arthur Beetson. Big Artie: the autobiography. ABC Books, 2004

1941 births
1975 deaths
Australian people of Vanuatuan descent
Australian people who died in prison custody
Australian rugby league players
Balmain Tigers players
Indigenous Australian rugby league players
Prisoners who died in Queensland detention
Redcliffe Dolphins players
Rugby league players from Queensland
Rugby league wingers